Drewria potomacensis is a Cretaceous megafossil member of the Gnetales, from the Potomac Group, hence its name. It was possibly a shrub. It is the only known species in the genus Drewria.

Description

Its stems were slender, with opposite and decussate leaves. Its reproductive structures consisted of short, loose spikes arranged in dichasial groups of 3.

References

Further reading
Friis, Else Marie, Peter R. Crane, and Kaj Raunsgaard Pedersen. Early flowers and angiosperm evolution. Cambridge University Press, 2011.

Wilson, Karen, and David Morrison, eds. Monocots: Systematics and Evolution: Systematics and Evolution. CSIRO PUBLISHING, 2000.
Pearson, David. New organic architecture: the breaking wave. University of California Press, 2001.
Hughes, Norman Francis. The enigma of angiosperm origins. Vol. 1. Cambridge University Press, 1994.
Bell, Peter R., and Alan R. Hemsley. Green plants: their origin and diversity. Cambridge University Press, 2000.

Gnetophyta
Prehistoric gymnosperm genera
Prehistoric plants of North America
Cretaceous plants